Doxocopa agathina, the agathina emperor, is a species of butterfly of the family Nymphalidae. It is found in the Guyanas, northern Brazil, and the Amazon region. It is also called the purple emperor but this name may also refer to the European butterfly Apatura iris.

Description

The color of the wings varies by sex. Males have bright blue or purple wings, but the females' wings are darker in color, usually shades of brown. Females also typically have a diagonal orange band across their forewings.

Like other members of the subfamily Apaturinae, the proboscis is green .

Subspecies
Doxocopa agathina agathina (Suriname)
Doxocopa agathina vacuna  (Brazil: Rio de Janeiro, Paraguay)

References

Apaturinae
Fauna of Brazil
Fauna of Peru
Nymphalidae of South America
Butterflies described in 1777
Taxa named by Pieter Cramer